Stevin W. John (born May 27, 1988), better known by his alias Blippi, is an American children's entertainer and educator on YouTube, Hulu, Netflix, HBO Max and Amazon Prime Video. The Blippi character that John portrays has a childlike, energetic and curious persona, and is always dressed in a blue and orange beanie cap, blue shirt, orange suspenders, and an orange bow tie.

Early life
John grew up "surrounded by tractors, cows, and horses" and has stated that as a child he wished to be a limousine driver and a fighter pilot.

Blippi

The idea for Blippi came to John after moving back to Ellensburg and witnessing his then two-year-old nephew viewing low-quality videos on YouTube. Blippi has been described as "an adult human man who dresses up in bright clothes and dances around America's deserted soft play centres for the benefit of YouTube". The first Blippi video was published on January 27, 2014, with John starring as Blippi and doing all of the filming, editing and graphics himself on the initial videos. Taking inspiration from children's educators and entertainers before him, such as Mr. Rogers, John wished to portray Blippi as educational but also as thinking and acting as a child would.

The videos garnered a large following with over a billion views on YouTube, and the production staff was expanded, to produce videos in Spanish, establish Blippi Toys, and begin offering DVDs and digital downloads. Some parents criticized the simplistic nature of the character in regard to his tone and repetitive songs about things such as garbage trucks, fire trucks, and pizza.

Steezy Grossman
John started making gross out videos in 2013 under the persona of Steezy Grossman. In a 2013 video, John performed the Harlem shake on a toilet and defecated on a naked friend. When the video was unearthed by BuzzFeed News in 2019, John said, "at the time, I thought this sort of thing was funny, but really it was stupid and tasteless, and I regret having ever done it." John used DMCA takedown notices to remove the video from social media and internet search engines.

References

External links

YouTube channel

1988 births
Living people
American YouTubers
People from Ellensburg, Washington